La Roy Sunderland (May 18, 1804 – May 15, 1885) was an American minister and abolitionist. He left the Methodist Episcopal Church in 1842 after a dispute over slavery and helped organize the Wesleyan Methodist Church the next year. He was also a noted mental philosopher.

References 

1804 births
1885 deaths
Members of the Methodist Episcopal Church
American abolitionists